John Brisbane (d. 1776 ?) was a Scottish physician.

Brisbane graduated M.D. at Edinburgh in 1750, and was admitted licentiate of the College of Physicians in 1766. He held the post of physician to the Middlesex Hospital from 1758 till 1773, when he was superseded for being absent without leave. His name disappears from the college list in 1776. He was the author of 'Select Cases in the Practice of Medicine,' 8vo, 1762, and 'Anatomy of Painting, with an Introduction giving a short View of Picturesque Anatomy,' fol. 1769. This work contains the six Tables of Albinus, the Anatomy of Celsus, with notes, and the Physiology of Cicero.

References

Year of birth missing
1776 deaths
18th-century Scottish medical doctors
Alumni of the University of Edinburgh